Degmaptera is a genus of moths in the family Sphingidae. The genus was erected by George Hampson in 1896.

Species
Degmaptera cadioui Brechlin & Kitching, 2009
Degmaptera mirabilis (Rothschild, 1894)
Degmaptera olivacea (Rothschild, 1894)

References

Smerinthini
Moth genera
Taxa named by George Hampson